The Koch Apartments is an apartment building located designed by architecture firm Kings & Dixon located at 209 W Second Ave Mitchell, Davison County, South Dakota. The building was listed on the National Register of Historic Places on October 31, 1996.

References

Mitchell, South Dakota
National Register of Historic Places in Davison County, South Dakota
Residential buildings on the National Register of Historic Places in South Dakota
Individually listed contributing properties to historic districts on the National Register in South Dakota
Art Deco architecture in South Dakota